The Ariel Award for Best Supporting Actor (Spanish: Premio Ariel a Mejor Coactuación Masculina) is an award presented by the Academia Mexicana de Artes y Ciencias Cinematográficas (AMACC) in Mexico. It is given in honor of an actor who has delivered an outstanding performance in a supporting role while working within the Mexican film industry. In 1947, the 1st and 2nd Ariel Awards were held, with José Baviera and Fernando Soto winning for the films La Barraca and Campeón Sin Corona, respectively. With the exception of the years 1958 to 1971, when the Ariel Awards were suspended, the award has been given annually. Nominees and winners are determined by a committee formed every year consisting of academy members (active and honorary), previous winners and individuals with at least two Ariel nominations; the committee submit their votes through the official AMACC website.

Since its inception, the award has been given to 48 actors. Ernesto Gómez Cruz has received the most awards in this category with four Ariels. José Carlos Ruiz is the most nominated performer, with seven nominations which resulted in three wins. On two separate instances all the nominees in the category were selected from the same film; the first time in 1974, with Sergio Bustamante, Andrés García, and Alejandro Parodi being nominated for the film El Principio, with the award handed to Bustamante; the second time, in 1976, with Gómez Cruz, Eduardo López Rojas, and Claudio Obregón being nominated (and awarded) for their roles in the film Actas de Marusia. Rojo Grau was nominated twice in 1986, for his performances in the films El Escuadrón de la Muerte and Gavilán o Paloma, losing to José Carlos Ruiz for Toña Machetes. In 1996, Damián Alcázar and Jesús Ochoa tied for their work in the films El Anzuelo and Entre Pancho Villa y Una Mujer Desnuda, respectively. 

Fifteen films have featured two or more nominated performances for Best Supporting Actor, Doña Perfecta (Carlos Navarro and Julio Villarreal), El Rebozo de Soledad (Carlos López Moctezuma and Domingo Soler), Las Tres Perfectas Casadas (José Elías Moreno and José María Linares), Cadena Perpetua (Ernesto Gómez Cruz and Narciso Busquets), El Callejón de los Milagros (Daniel Giménez Cacho and Esteban Soberanes), Por Si No Te Vuelvo a Ver (Max Kerlow and Justo Martínez), El Evangelio de las Maravillas (Bruno Bichir and Rafael Inclán), La Ley de Herodes (Pedro Armendáriz and Salvador Sánchez), Matando Cabos (Joaquín Cosío and Raúl Méndez), La Zona (Mario Zaragoza and Alan Chávez), El Infierno (Cosío and Gómez Cruz), Días de Gracia (Kristyan Ferrer and Zaragoza), Colosio: El Asesinato (Giménez Cacho and Dagoberto Gama), La Delgada Línea Amarilla (Cosío, Silverio Palacios and Gustavo Sánchez Parra), and La 4a Compañía (Manuel Ojeda, Dario T. Pie and Carlos Valencia); Navarro, López Moctezuma, Moreno, Gómez Cruz, Kerlow, Armendáriz, Zaragoza, Cosío (for El Infierno), Giménez Cacho (for Colosio: El Asesinato) won the award. As of the 2022 ceremony, Kristyan Ferrer is the most recent winner in this category for his role in Los Minutos Negros.

Winners and nominees

Multiple wins and nominations 

The following individuals have received multiple Best Supporting Actor awards:

The following actors received four or more Best Supporting Actor nominations:

See also 
 Academy Award for Best Supporting Actor

References

Ariel Awards
Film awards for supporting actor